Scharfenstein may refer to:

 a district of Drebach in Erzgebirgskreis in Saxony

Scharfenstein is the name of the following geographic features:
 Scharfenstein (Ilsenburg), a mountain in the Harz Mountains of Germany
 Scharfenstein (Lusatian Mountains), Oybin in Saxony, Germany, known as the Lusatian Matterhorn
 Scharfenstein (Wernigerode), a hill in the Harz Mountains, Saxony-Anhalt, Germany
 Scharfenstein (Hesse), an extinct basalt volcano near Gudensberg, Hesse, Germany
 Scharfenstein, German name of the Slovakian mountain, Záruby

Scharfenstein is the name of:
 Scharfenstein Castle (Ore Mountains), Saxony, Germany
 Scharfenstein Castle (Kiedrich), in Kiedrich in Hesse, Germany
 German name of a castle in the Central Bohemian Uplands in Czech Republic, see Šarfenštejn Castle
 German name of Ostrý Kameň Castle in Slovakia (Hrad Ostrý Kameň)

See also 
 Scharfenstein Castle (disambiguation)